Crook Glacier is located in the U.S. state of Oregon.

References

See also
 List of glaciers in the United States

Glaciers of Oregon
Glaciers of Deschutes County, Oregon